Daniel Beard may refer to:

 Daniel Carter Beard (1850–1941), American illustrator, author, youth leader and social reformer
 Daniel P. Beard (born 1943), American politician